The Callanish Stones (or "Callanish I":  or ) are an arrangement of standing stones placed in a cruciform pattern with a central stone circle. They were erected in the late Neolithic era, and were a focus for ritual activity during the Bronze Age. They are near the village of Callanish on the west coast of Lewis in the Outer Hebrides, Scotland.

Location
The Callanish Stones are situated on a low ridge above the waters of Loch Roag with the hills of Great Bernera as a backdrop.

Numerous other ritual sites lie within a few kilometres. These include at least three other circles, several arcs, alignments and single stones; many visible from the main site. The most impressive – Callanish II and Callanish III – lie just over a kilometre southeast of the main Callanish Stones, and originally consisted of circles of stones at least eight in number. The existence of other monuments in the area implies that Callanish was an active focus for prehistoric religious activity for at least 1500 years. (see Callanish III, Callanish IV, Callanish VIII and Callanish X). Historic Environment Scotland states that the stones were erected roughly 5,000 years ago, pre-dating Stonehenge.

Management
The Callanish Stones are managed by Historic Environment Scotland. There is The Calanais Stones Visitor Centre operated by Urras Nan Tursachan (The Standing Stones Trust).

Description

The Callanish Stones consist of a stone circle of thirteen stones with a monolith near the middle. Five rows of standing stones connect to this circle. Two long rows of stones running almost parallel to each other from the stone circle to the north-northeast form a kind of avenue. In addition, there are shorter rows of stones to the west-southwest, south and east-northeast. The stones are all of the same rock type, namely the local Lewisian gneiss. Within the stone circle is a chambered tomb to the east of the central stone.

Centre stone
The central monolith stands 0.8 metres west of the true centre of the stone circle. The stone is 4.8 metres high, 1.5 metres wide and 0.3 metres thick. The largest sides of the stone are almost perfectly oriented to the north and south. The monolith has the shape of a ship's rudder and probably weighs about seven tonnes.

Stone circle
The stone circle consists of thirteen stones and has a diameter of 11.4 metres. The stone circle is not a perfect circle, but is a ring with a flattened east side (13.4 metres north–south by 12 metres east–west). The stones have an average height of three metres. The ring covers an area of 124 square metres. This is quite small compared to similar circles, including the nearby Callanish II which is 2.5 times as large.

Northern avenue
The avenue connects to the stone circle from the north-northeast. The avenue is 83.2 metres long. The avenue has 19 stones remaining: nine stones are on the eastern side, ten on the western side. The largest stone is 3.5 metres high and stands on the western end of the row. The two rows are not exactly parallel to each other but fan out: at the north end the rows are 6.7 metres apart, while the distance between the rows is 6 metres at the south end. From the circle the height of the stones decreases towards the middle of the avenue; from there the height increases again. The stones of the eastern side of the avenue have only three-quarters of the height of the stones on the western side.

Stone rows
As well as the two stone rows of the avenue, there are three stone rows connecting to the circle. One comes from the east-northeast, one from the south, and one from the west-southwest. The east-northeast row today consists of five stones and is 23.2 metres long. The southern row consists of five stones and is 27.2 metres long. The west-southwest row consists of four stones and is 13 metres long.

None of the stone rows is aimed at the centre of the stone circle. The east-northeast row is aligned to a point 2 metres south of the centre; the south row points to 1 metre west of the centre and the west-southwest row points to 1 metre south of the centre.

Chambered tomb

Between the central and the eastern monolith of the stone circle is a chambered tomb 6.4 metres long. This was built later than the stone circle and is squashed in between the eastern stones and the central monolith.

There is another stone cairn just on the northeast side of the stone circle. It has been reduced to ground-level and the outline can barely be traced. It is not necessarily an original part of the site.

Archaeology and dating

There were limited excavations in 1980–81 which provided some information on the development of the site. The first traces of human activity are indicated by a broad ditch (no longer visible above ground) which appears to have belonged to some structure or enclosure. This may have been ritual, but could instead have been domestic. In the centuries around 3000 BC, however, the site was turned over to agriculture, which obliterated most of the earlier traces. After this, the site was allowed to grass over for a time.

The stone circle was set up between 2900 and 2600 BC. It is not clear whether the stone alignments were constructed at the same time as the circle, or later. Some time after the erection of the stones, a small chambered tomb was inserted into the eastern part of the stone circle. The many pottery fragments found indicate that the tomb was used for several centuries. These pottery fragments included not only the local Hebridean pots, but numerous sherds of beaker vessels (dating to around 2000–1700 BC) and shards of grooved ware.

Around 1500–1000 BC the complex fell out of use and was despoiled by the later Bronze Age farmers. Fragments of pots appear to have been cast out of the chamber. This may have been just ordinary agriculture, but it may conceivably have been ritual cleansing. There appears to have been a later rebuilding of the tomb, but this may have been for domestic use as there is no evidence for any later ritual use of the monument. Excavations in 1999–2000, to the south of the stones, found fragments of a prehistoric field system buried beneath blanket peat, as well as stone structures, including buildings, walls, clearance cairns and cobbled surfaces. The analyses found that these features were the result of prehistoric farming activity from the Late Bronze Age/Early Iron Age indicating the whole area was used for farming at that time. Between 1000 BC and 500 BC the stones were covered by a thick layer of turf. It is estimated that the place was abandoned around 800 BC. Only in 1857 was the overlying 1.5 metres of peat removed.

Later history

The first written reference to the stones was by Lewis native John Morisone, who around 1680 wrote that the stones were men "converted into stone by ane Inchanter" and set up in a ring "for devotione". Sometime around 1695 Martin Martin visited the site and was told by the local people that "it was a place appointed for worship in the time of heathenism, and that the chief druid or priest stood near the big stone in the centre, from whence he addressed himself to the people that surrounded him." In his 1726 work on the druids, John Toland specifically identified Diodorus Siculus' Hyperborea with Lewis, and the "spherical temple" mentioned by Diodorus with the Callanish Stones. In 1743, William Stukeley described the stone circle as a druid circle and the avenue like a serpent. In 1819, geologist John MacCulloch published the first accurate description. In 1846, the Danish historian J. J. A. Worsaae made a sketch and plan of the Callanish Stones.

In 1857 peat to a depth of five feet (1.5 metres) was cleared away, under the orders of the proprietor of Lewis, James Matheson, revealing the chambered tomb and the true height of the stones. In 1885 the Callanish Stones were taken into state care.

Interpretation
Alexander Thom and Gerald Hawkins suggested that the stones were a prehistoric lunar observatory. Others have proposed a relationship between the stones, the moon and the Clisham range in Harris. Critics of these theories argue that several alignments are likely to exist purely by chance in any such structure, and many factors such as the weathering and displacement of the stones over the millennia mean there can be no certainty of any alignments, original or otherwise.

In folklore
According to one tradition, the Callanish Stones were petrified giants who would not convert to Christianity. In the 17th century the people of Lewis were calling the stones fir bhrèige ("false men"). Another legend is that early on midsummer morning an entity known as the "Shining One" walks the length of the avenue, his coming heralded by the call of the cuckoo.

In popular culture

In 1974, the sculptor Gerald Laing created a work known as Callanish for Strathclyde University's  campus in the centre of Glasgow. He planted 16 abstract steel girders in the ground, intended to relate to the configuration of the stones.  The sculpture is popularly referred to as "Steelhenge".
The stones feature as a setting in the 1974 novel Lookout Cartridge by American author Joseph McElroy.
In 1984, the new romantic band Ultravox used an image of the stones on the cover of their album Lament. They filmed parts of their promo' video for the "One Small Day" single at the site (the 'performance' parts of the video were actually shot at the Callanish III site); it was the first single taken from that album.
In 1988 Jon Mark released a CD, The Standing Stones of Callanish, intended to evoke Britain's Celtic legacy.
Julian Cope's 1992 album Jehovahkill features the stones on its cover.
The Waterboys' 1993 album Dream Harder contains a song called "Wonders of Lewis" which appears to reference the  stones.
The stones are featured in the plot and setting of Death of an Adept (1996), a novel by Katherine Kurtz and Deborah Turner Harris. They are a central part of the cover art (by Joe Burleson) for the 1997 mass-market paperback edition.
The stones are also shown on the front cover of the 1996 CD Celtic Nights, by Enaid and Einalem, released by Northsound Music.
The Dutch melodic death metal band, Callenish Circle, took their name from the stones, slightly changing the spelling.
The 1998 book The Last Highlander by Claire Delacroix features the stones as a key location.
The Pixar film Brave (2012) features several scenes set in and around the stones.
 Bank of Scotland debit cards feature an image of the stones, among other Scottish landmarks including the Falkirk Wheel.
The Starz TV series, Outlander (2014), has used the stones as a model for a fictional stone circle near Culloden called Craigh na Dun. The series is based on a series of books by Diana Gabaldon. The stones are depicted in the show as having time-travel abilities when touched.

Other nearby sites
Archaeologists usually refer to the main monument as "Callanish I", because there are several other megalithic sites in the vicinity: 
  (Callanish II) – stone circle
  (Callanish III) – stone circle
  (Callanish IV) – stone circle
  (Callanish V) – stone alignment
  (Callanish VI) – stone circle
  (Callanish VII) – ancient settlement or shieling (stone dwelling used while tending cattle on summer pastures)
  (Callanish VIII) – unique semicircular monument at the edge of a sheer cliff on the nearby island of Great Bernera
  (Callanish VIIIa) - standing stone
  (Callanish IX) - stones
  (Callanish XI) - standing stone; stones; cairns
  (Callanish XII) - standing stone
  (Callanish XIII) - stone setting
  (Callanish XIV W) - stone setting
  (Callanish XIV e) - stones
  (Callanish XV) - standing stone
  (Callanish XVI) - standing stone; stones
  (Callanish XVII) - standing stone (possible)
  (Callanish XVIII) - standing stone (possible)
  (Callanish XIX) - standing stone (possible)

There are many other sites nearby; not all are now visible.

References

External links

Callanish Visitor Centre

Megalithic monuments in Scotland
Buildings and structures completed in the 22nd century BC
Archaeoastronomy
Archaeological sites in the Outer Hebrides
History of the Outer Hebrides
Isle of Lewis
Stone circles in Na h-Eileanan Siar
Scheduled monuments in Scotland
Stone Age sites in Scotland
Historic Environment Scotland properties
Neolithic Scotland
Menhirs